Jed Metcher is a former Grand Prix motorcycle racer from Australia. He is a former competitor in the Australian 125cc Championship, the Australian Supersport Championship, the Supersport World Championship, the British Superbike Championship, and the European Superstock 600 Championship where he finished as champion in 201, the IDM Supersport Championship and the IDM Superbike Championship. Jed Metcher is a supporter of the Hands Across the Water Charity bike ride.

Career statistics
2006- 8th, Australian 125 Championship #13    Honda RS125R
2007- 7th, Australian 125 Championship #13    Honda RS125R
2008- 3rd, Australian 125 Championship #13    Honda RS125R
2009- 8th, Australian Supersport Championship #71    Yamaha YZF-R6
2010- 17th, IDM Superbike Championship #77    Honda CBR1000RR
2011- 1st, European Superstock 600 Championship #3    Yamaha YZF-R6
2012- 14th, Supersport World Championship #3    Yamaha YZF-R6
2013- 4th, IDM Supersport Championship #3    Suzuki GSX-R600
2014- Australasian Formula OZ Championship #91    Kawasaki ZX-10R
2014- Winner of the 63rd Harvie Wiltshire Memorial Trophy at Phillip Island #91    Kawasaki ZX-10R
2015- 6th, International Island Classic. Winner of race four #91 Suzuki Katana
2015- 33rd, British Superbike Championship #68  Kawasaki ZX-10R

Grand Prix motorcycle racing

By season

Races by year
(key)

Supersport World Championship

Races by year
(key)

Superbike World Championship

Races by year
(key)

References

External links
 Profile on motogp.com

Living people
1990 births
Australian motorcycle racers
125cc World Championship riders
Supersport World Championship riders
Superbike World Championship riders
FIM Superstock 1000 Cup riders